The Rain at Night is a 1979 South Korean film directed by Park Chul-soo. At the 1980 Baeksang Arts Awards, Park was given a New Talent award for directing this film. The film is based on Park Bum-shin's 1975 novel of the same title.

Plot
Ga-hi, a kindergarten teacher, is raped one night while on her way to meet her boyfriend, Young-woo. She later recognises her attacker as Hwang Sa-bin, a boxer, and after seeing him lose a fight begins to develop feelings towards him.

Cast
 Lee Young-ha - Young-woo
 Lee Deok-hwa - Hwang Sa-bin
 Park Geun-hyung
 Son Mi-ja
 Kim Young-ran - Ga-hee

References

External links
 
 
 The Rain at Night at Cine21 

1979 films
1970s Korean-language films
South Korean romantic drama films
Films directed by Park Chul-soo